Jessica Birkel (born 29 January 1988) is a former Luxembourger international footballer who played as a striker. She is currently Luxembourg's most-capped women's player.

External links

References 

1988 births
Living people
Luxembourgian women's footballers
Luxembourg women's international footballers
Women's association football forwards